Stephanie Ashworth is an Australian bassist, photographer, artist and columnist, known for being a member with the bands Sandpit and Something for Kate, where she performs with her spouse and frontman, Paul Dempsey.

Music career
Early in Ashworth's career, she played in the bands Sandpit and Scared of Horses. Her most recent band is Something for Kate, which she joined replacing bassist Toby Ralph in March 1998, a fill-in after Julian Carroll's departure. She frequently performs barefoot. In 2000, she was offered a place in Courtney Love's band, Hole, but declined.

Writing and photography
Ashworth has contributed artwork and photography to the releases of Something for Kate, and photos of New York City, United States (US) were used for the 2012 album Leave Your Soul to Science.

Since January 2008, Ashworth has written a monthly column for Jmag, the magazine of Australian radio station Triple J.

Personal life
Ashworth married her bandmate and Something for Kate frontman, Paul Dempsey, in 2006, and remains in this relationship as of 2022.

 Following the release of Dempsey's solo album Everything Is True, they relocated to New York City, United States, in 2010. Their son Miller was born in 2011.

Awards and nominations

APRA Awards
The APRA Awards are presented annually from 1982 by the Australasian Performing Right Association (APRA), "honouring composers and songwriters".

! 
|-
| 2002
| "Monsters" by Something for Kate (Paul Dempsey, Stephanie Ashworth, Clint Hyndman)
| Song of the Year
| 
|
|-
| 2021 
| "Situation Room by Something for Kate (Paul Dempsey, Stephanie Ashworth, Clint Hyndman)
| Song of the Year
| 
| 
|-

References

1974 births
Living people
21st-century women musicians
21st-century bass guitarists
Australian bass guitarists
Something for Kate members
Women bass guitarists